Bryan Grill is a visual effects artist.

He has been nominated for three Academy Awards and one BAFTA award.

Oscar history

Both of these are in the category of Best Visual Effects.

83rd Academy Awards-Nominated for Hereafter. Nomination shared with Joe Farrell, Michael Owens and Stephan Trojansky. Lost to Inception.
87th Academy Awards-Nominated for Captain America: The Winter Soldier. Nomination shared with Dan DeLeeuw, Russell Earl and Dan Sudick. Lost to Interstellar.
94th Academy Awards-Nominated for Free Guy. Nomination shared with Swen Gillberg, Nikos Kalaitzidis and Dan Sudick.

Selected filmography
 Apollo 13 (1995)
 The Fifth Element (1997)
 Titanic (1997)
 Armageddon (1998)
 Dr. Seuss' How the Grinch Stole Christmas (2000)
 Star Trek: Nemesis (2002)
 The Time Machine (2002)
 Flags of Our Fathers (2006)
 Letters from Iwo Jima (2006)
 Pirates of the Caribbean: At World's End (2007)
 G.I. Joe: The Rise of Cobra (2009)
 2012 (2009)
 Hereafter (2010)
 The Avengers (2012)
 Journey 2: The Mysterious Island (2012)
 Iron Man 3 (2013)
 Captain America: The Winter Soldier (2014)
 San Andreas (2015)
 Black Panther (2018)
 X-Men: Dark Phoenix (2019)
 Free Guy (2021)

References

External links

Living people
Year of birth missing (living people)
Special effects people